Vasili Stepanovich Osipanov (Осипанов, Василий Степанович in Russian) (2.21(3.5).1861, Tomsk — 5.8(20).1887), Russian revolutionary, member of Narodnaya Volya.

In 1881—1886, Osipanov was a student at the University of Kazan, where he joined the revolutionary movement. He later transferred to St.Petersburg University. In 1886, Osipanov joined the "Terrorist Faction" of Narodnaya Volya and, together with Aleksandr Ulyanov and others, took part in preparing the assassination of Alexander III. He was placed in charge of the bombthrowers.

Osipanov was arrested on March 1, 1887 and later executed in the Shlisselburg Fortress.

References

1861 births
1887 deaths
People from Tomsk
People from Tomsk Governorate
Narodnaya Volya
Russian revolutionaries
Executed revolutionaries
People from Tomsk Oblast
19th-century executions by the Russian Empire